"She's Got Standards" is the fourth single from the British indie rock band The Rifles, from their debut record No Love Lost. The single was released in July 2006 and reached number 32 on the UK singles chart. The CD version of the single features a cover of The Cure's 1985 single "In Between Days", which the band showcased on Zane Lowe's Radio 1 show.

Track listings

References
 

2006 singles
The Rifles (band) songs
2006 songs